Courtney Lynn Kaiulani Mathewson (born September 14, 1986) is an American water polo player, part of the US team that won the gold medal at the 2012 Summer Olympics. She played water polo for the University of California, Los Angeles (UCLA) Bruins during their four-consecutive NCAA National Champion Women's Water Polo championships, and was named to the All-Tournament first team. At UCLA, she majored in sociology.

College career

During the 2008 season, Mathewson scored 54 goals in 33 matches. The Anaheim Hills, Calif., resident scored four goals in the final two NCAA Tournament matches – including three in an 11–4 semifinal win over UC Davis – to earn all-tournament team accolades.

Honors
Mathewson has earned prestigious honors after leading the Bruins to the undefeated season. Courtney was named to the Pac-12 All-Century Team.  She also won the 2008 Peter J. Cutino Award, which is presented annually to the outstanding female and male collegiate water polo players in the United States. The award is named in honor of the late Peter J. Cutino, a former University of California and The Olympic Club coach, who died in September 2004. Cutino, who is enshrined in the U.S. Water Polo Hall of Fame, earned National Water Polo Coach of the Year honors 17 times and led California to eight NCAA titles.

Mathewson and teammate Jillian Kraus captured Mountain Pacific Sports Federation (MPSF) Co-Player of the Year honors after having led UCLA to the MPSF Tournament title for the second consecutive year. In the MPSF Tournament, Mathewson was named the tournament MVP after having combined for seven goals in the final two matches.

She joins other Bruins, Sean Kern, Coralie Simmons, Natalie Golda, and Kelly Rulon as Peter J. Cutino Award winners. Mathewson has also been named Division I Player of the Year by the Association of College Water Polo Coaches (ACWPC).

Mathewson currently trains with the USA Water Polo National Team and in October 2011 helped lead Team USA to the gold medal at the Pan American games. On November 10, 2021, she was inducted into USA Water Polo Hall of Fame.

See also
 United States women's Olympic water polo team records and statistics
 List of Olympic champions in women's water polo
 List of Olympic medalists in water polo (women)
 List of world champions in women's water polo
 List of World Aquatics Championships medalists in water polo

References

External links
 
USA Water Polo Profile
Facebook Profile
Instagram Profile
Twitter profile

1986 births
Living people
People from Anaheim Hills, California
Sportspeople from Orange, California
American female water polo players
Water polo drivers
UCLA Bruins women's water polo players
Water polo players at the 2012 Summer Olympics
Water polo players at the 2016 Summer Olympics
Medalists at the 2012 Summer Olympics
Medalists at the 2016 Summer Olympics
Olympic gold medalists for the United States in water polo
World Aquatics Championships medalists in water polo
Water polo players at the 2011 Pan American Games
Water polo players at the 2015 Pan American Games
Pan American Games medalists in water polo
Pan American Games gold medalists for the United States
Medalists at the 2011 Pan American Games
Medalists at the 2015 Pan American Games